Research in Accounting Regulation is a peer-reviewed academic journal of accounting published by Elsevier. The editor-in-chief is Gary John Previts. The journal was established in 1987 and is abstracted and indexed by Scopus. The focus of the journal is on the role and relationship of regulatory and self-regulatory bodies on the practice and content of accounting.

References

External links

Accounting journals